Litton, also known as Ivy, is an unincorporated community located in Bolivar County, Mississippi, United States.

A post office operated under the name Ivy from 1900 to 1913.

References

Unincorporated communities in Bolivar County, Mississippi
Unincorporated communities in Mississippi